Party in the Graveyard is the debut album by the American electronic rock band Ghost Town.

Most of the songs were already available for listening on YouTube, with four more being uploaded on December 21, 2012. It was released onto iTunes independently on January 15, 2013. On June 11, 2013, Ghost Town added 6 singles from the album onto iTunes: "You're So Creepy", "Off with Her Head", "Monster", "Skeleton", "Voodoo", and "Universe".

Ghost Town was signed to Fueled By Ramen on May 7, 2013. Shortly after, Fueled By Ramen announced a re-release of Party in the Graveyard, with the addition of four tracks. All tracks were remastered, and the album received new cover art. The album was released on November 19, 2013.

Track listing

Personnel
Ghost Town
Kevin "Ghost" McCullough - vocals
Alix "Monster" Koochaki - guitar, backing vocals
Evan Pearce - keyboards, synthesizers
Manny "MannYtheDrummer" Dominick - drums, percussion

Production
Alix Koochaki - Engineer, producer
Evan Pearce - Engineer, producer

References

Ghost Town (band) albums
2013 debut albums